Thyrocare Technologies Limited is an Indian multinational chain of diagnostic and preventive care laboratories, headquartered in Navi Mumbai, Maharashtra. The company has a total of 1,122 outlets (As of 2021) and collection centers across India and parts of Nepal, Bangladesh and the Middle East.

On 26 June 2021, Indian e-pharmacy and online healthcare aggregator PharmEasy's parent API Holdings acquired a 66.1% controlling stake in Thyrocare, making Thyrocare the first Indian listed company to be acquired by a startup.

History 

Thyrocare was started in 1996, by A. Velumani, ex-scientist at Bhabha Atomic Research Centre (BARC), Mumbai, Maharashtra. The first laboratory was set up in Byculla, Mumbai, with an initial focus on thyroid testing considering a huge potential for thyroid testing in India. The laboratory was later shifted to a larger set-up, its main headquarters and central processing laboratory at Navi Mumbai. The company introduced a franchisee model for procuring samples to be sent for testing at their central laboratory in Mumbai.

Thyrocare initially started with thyroid testing but now has more than 350+ tests and packages to encourage effective testing and more than 83 odd profiles comprising different tests for preventive care and wellness under its brand Aarogyam. Thyrocare also played one of the biggest role in India during the COVID-19 surge, it carried out more than 8 Lacs test a month.  Thyrocare's 68% of business comes from the DSA model to promote its services. 

In 2010, Thyrocare raised its first private equity funding with INR 188 crore from New Delhi-based CX Partners for a 30% stake. It set up a subsidiary, Nuclear Healthcare Limited, which uses PET-CT to detect and locate cancerous cells.

In 2014, Siemens Healthcare's Diagnostic Division installed its world's largest laboratory automation track – Aptio Automation – at its laboratory in Mumbai. Thyrocare became the first laboratory in India to install this automation by Siemens.

In April 2016, Thyrocare made its initial public offering (IPO), and became the second diagnostic firm in India to be listed on BSE and NSE.

In 2021, PharmEasy parent API Holdings acquired a 66.1% stake in Thyrocare Technologies Ltd.

Controversies
In April 2020, Brihanmumbai Municipal Corporation issued a show cause notice to Thyrocare over lapses in its testing of Covid-19 samples and ordered the company to stop testing as "incomplete or wrong information about patients were found in the reports". In May 2020, Panvel Municipal Corporation ordered Thyrocare to stop testing samples in Panvel city limits as the lab was producing false positive reports. In June 2020, the Navi Mumbai Municipal Corporation demanded cancellation of Thyrocare's registration after discrepancies in the lab's report led to a patient's death, while Thane Municipal Corporation banned Thyrocare in the city for producing false positive reports. In July 2020, a Thyrocare lab in Pune was banned from conducting Covid-19 tests after producing false positive reports.

References

Laboratories in India
Indian companies established in 1996
Companies listed on the National Stock Exchange of India
Companies listed on the Bombay Stock Exchange
Companies based in Mumbai
Health care companies of India